The Capitoline Temple is an ancient monument located in the old city of Volubilis in Fès-Meknès, Morocco. It dates from the Roman era, and was situated in the ancient Kingdom of Mauretania.

The building incorporates a tetrastyle architectural design, and was dedicated to the Roman Emperor Macrinus. The temple is earmarked for the trinity of Roman gods, Juno, Jupiter and Minerva. According to Rogerson, a council would meet below the Capitoline Temple in order to make a declaration of war, and then later return to this location with the booty of the resultant war.

The Romans also constructed temples of the same name in Ancient Rome and other locations within the Roman Empire.

See also
Arch of Trajan (Timgad)
Libyco-Punic Mausoleum of Dougga
Madghacen
Roman architecture

Line notes

References
 C. Michael Hogan, Volubilis, The Megalithic Portal, ed. Andy Burnham (2007)
 Barnaby Rogerson (2000} Marrakesh, Fez and Rabat, New Holland Publishers, 290 pages  

Roman sites in Morocco
Temples of Jupiter
Buildings and structures in Fès-Meknès
Temples of Minerva
Temples of Juno
Capitoline Triad